Dębnica may refer to the following places in Poland:
Dębnica, Lower Silesian Voivodeship (south-west Poland)
Dębnica, Masovian Voivodeship (east-central Poland)
Dębnica, Gniezno County in Greater Poland Voivodeship (west-central Poland)
Dębnica, Ostrów Wielkopolski County in Greater Poland Voivodeship (west-central Poland)
Dębnica, Pomeranian Voivodeship (north Poland)